The 1955 NSWRFL season was the 48th season of the New South Wales Rugby Football League. Ten teams from across Sydney competed for the NSWRFL Premiership J. J. Giltinan Shield during the season, which culminated in a replay of the previous year's Grand Final between the South Sydney and Newtown clubs.

Season summary
Halfway through the 1955 season Souths were in equal last place having won just three of nine matches. From that point they didn't lose another game, winning nine season encounters in a row before the finals. Eventually they finished fourth. Had they lost a single one of these games they would have missed the finals.

In the second last match of the regular season Souths met Manly-Warringah and were behind 4–7 with moments to go. Clive Churchill had broken his arm early in the game tackling Manly winger George Hugo but refused to leave the field. Souths lock Les Cowie managed to score a try in the corner and Churchill with a broken arm took a sideline conversion attempt that wobbled over the posts and won Souths the game. Churchill would take no part in Souths' 1955 finals campaign.

Teams

Ladder

Finals

Grand Final

After their incredible nine game end-of-season run and having come from behind in both their semi-finals it looked unlikely that Souths’ fairytale would end happily on Grand Final day. They were without stars Clive Churchill and Greg Hawick. Newtown were the minor premiers and had eleven of their 1954 Grand Final side back for the 1955 decider, all fit, experienced and keen to avenge their 1954 loss.

The 1955 Grand Final was very closely fought out. Souths trailed 4–8 at half-time and the Bluebags looked home with an 11–7 lead with ten minutes remaining. In the final moments captain-coach Jack Rayner managed to win a strike in the play-the-ball and toed it through. Newtown lock Peter Ryan fumbled and again Rayner got the boot to it. Souths halfback Col Donohoe won the race and grounded the ball next to the posts, enabling an easy conversion by Bernie Purcell for the Rabbitohs to take a one-point lead.

A last gasp long-range penalty goal attempt from Bluebags  Gordon Clifford was unsuccessful (it passed between the posts but fractionally under the crossbar) and Souths won by a single point. Despite being the best performed side for two successive seasons Newtown had nothing in the trophy cabinet to show for it. Souths had timed an extraordinary premiership run to absolute perfection.

Jack Rayner's fifth grand final win that day stands along with Ken Kearney's five wins by 1960 as the most number of grand final successes by an individual as captain. As captain-coach for all of those wins Rayner was thus also the first man to coach a side to five grand final victories, a record subsequently matched by Jack Gibson and beaten in 2006 by Wayne Bennett.

 South Sydney 12
Tries: Moir, Donohoe. Goals: Purcell 3.

 Newtown 11
Try: Considine. Goals: Clifford 3. Field Goal: Clifford

Player statistics
The following statistics are as of the conclusion of Round 18.

Top 5 point scorers

Top 5 try scorers

Top 5 goal scorers

References

External links
Rugby League Tables – Season 1955 The World of Rugby League
Results: 1951-60 at rabbitohs.com.au
1955 J J Giltinan Shield at rleague.com
NSWRFL season 1955 at rugbyleagueproject.com

New South Wales Rugby League premiership
Nswrfl Season